Thoughts of the Past  is an oil painting on canvas by English Pre-Raphaelite artist John Roddam Spencer Stanhope, first exhibited in 1859 and currently housed at Tate Britain.

History
Known as one of the "second-generation" of Pre-Raphaelites, Stanhope was among Dante Gabriel Rossetti's mural-painting party at the Oxford Union in 1857, together with Arthur Hughes, John Hungerford Pollen, Valentine Prinsep, Ned Burne-Jones and William Morris (nicknamed Topsy). He was a founder member of the Hogarth Club, a direct descendant of the Pre-Raphaelite Brotherhood.

This painting, with his depiction of a prostitute remorsefully contemplating her life, showed a subject typical of the Victorian era. Works such as Thoughts of the Past and Rossetti's Found (1855) allowed the genteel gallery-going public to sympathise with societal problems - from a safe distance. It was pictures such as William Holman Hunt's The Awakening Conscience (1854), illustrating a married man and his mistress, which were regarded as threatening to Victorian family life.

Stanhope painted Thoughts of the Past in a studio just above one owned by Rossetti. Although his model is recognisably Pre-Raphaelite, the background of his painting hints at his own individual, artistic style, which was yet to emerge. The river, boats and bridge owe more to the conventional style of the art in the Royal Academy than to that of the Pre-Raphaelite Brotherhood.see image detail below

See also
 English art
 List of Pre-Raphaelite paintings

References

Further reading
 Hilto, Timoth, The Pre-Raphelites, Thames and Hudson (1970).
 Robinson, Michael, The Pre-Raphaelites, Flame Tree Publishing (2007).
 Todd, Pamela, Pre-Raphaelites at Home, Watson-Giptill Publications, (2001).

External links
Thoughts of the Past at Tate Britain
John Roddam Spencer Stanhope, Thoughts of the Past, exhibited 1859, Smarthistory video
 John Roddam Spencer Stanhope, artist (Victorian Art in Britain)
History of Cawthorne, Chapter IV, Cannon Hall
 John Roddam Spencer Stanhope by Lewis Carroll (National Portrait Gallery)
"John Roddam Spencer Stanhope and the Tomb of His Daughter Mary: An Ongoing Research Project" by Nic Peeters and Judy Oberhausen
 Official website of Tate Britain

Pre-Raphaelite paintings
Collection of the Tate galleries
1859 paintings
Ships in art
Bridges in art